This is a list of the Sites of Special Scientific Interest (SSSIs) in the Denbighshire Area of Search (AoS).

Sites

References

Denbighshire
Denbighshire